Chief Justice of Indonesia may refer to:

 Chief Justice of the Supreme Court of Indonesia
 Chief Justice of the Constitutional Court of Indonesia